A combat helmet or battle helmet is a type of helmet. It is a piece of personal armor designed specifically to protect the head during combat. Modern combat helmets are mainly designed to protect from shrapnel and fragments, offer some protection against small arms, and offer a mounting point for devices such as night-vision goggles and communications equipment.

History 

Helmets are among the oldest forms of personal protective equipment and are known to have been worn by the Akkadians/Sumerians in the 23rd century BC, Mycenaean Greeks since the 17th century BC, the Assyrians around 900 BC, ancient Greeks and Romans, throughout the Middle Ages, and up to the end of the 17th century by many combatants. Their materials and construction became more advanced as weapons became more and more powerful. Initially constructed from leather and brass, and then bronze and iron during the Bronze and Iron Ages, they soon came to be made entirely from forged steel in many societies after about 950 AD. At that time, they were purely military equipment, protecting the head from cutting blows with swords, flying arrows, and low-velocity musketry. 
Iron helmets were deployed into the cavalry of the Mali Empire to protect the cavalrymen and their mount.

Military use of helmets declined after 1670, and rifled firearms ended their use by foot soldiers after 1700 but the Napoleonic era saw ornate cavalry helmets reintroduced for cuirassiers and dragoons in some armies which continued to be used by French forces during World War I as late as 1915.

World War I and its increased use of artillery renewed the need for steel helmets, with the French Adrian helmet and the British Brodie helmet being the first modern steel helmets used on the battlefield, soon followed by the adoption of similar steel helmets, such as the Stahlhelm by the other warring nations. Such helmets offered protection for the head from shrapnel and fragments.

Today's militaries often use high quality helmets made of ballistic materials such as Kevlar and Twaron, which offer improved protection. Some helmets also have good non-ballistic protective qualities, against threats such as concussive shock waves from explosions.

Many of today's combat helmets have been adapted for modern warfare requirements and upgraded with STANAG rails to act as a platform for mounting cameras, video cameras and VAS Shrouds for the mounting of night-vision devices.

Beginning in the early 20th century, combat helmets have often been equipped with helmet covers to offer greater camouflage. There have been two main types of covers—mesh nets were earlier widely used, but most modern combat helmets use camouflage cloth covers instead.

By the late 20th century, starting in the 1970s and 1980s, new materials such as Kevlar and Twaron began replacing steel as the primary material for combat helmets, in an effort to improve weight reduction and ballistic protection, and protection against traumatic brain injury. This practice still continues into the 21st century, with further advancement and refinements in the fibers used, design and shape of the helmet, and increased modularity. Early helmet systems of this new design are the American PASGT, the Spanish MARTE, the Italian SEPT-2 PLUS, and British Mk6.

Padding 
Cushioning is used to negate concussive injuries. Researchers at the Lawrence Livermore National Laboratory published a study in 2011 that concluded that the addition of an ⅛ inch (3 mm) of cushion decreased the impact force to the skull by 24%.

See also 
 List of combat helmets

References

External links 

 

 
Headgear
Medieval helmets
Military uniforms
Body armor